During the 1966–67 English football season, Everton F.C. competed in the Football League First Division.

Final league table

Results

Charity Shield

Football League First Division

FA Cup

European Cup Winners' Cup

Squad

References

1966–67
Everton F.C. season